The  was a domain of the Tokugawa Shogunate of Japan during the Edo period from 1601 to 1871.

The Hiroshima Domain was based at Hiroshima Castle in Aki Province, in the modern city of Hiroshima, located in the Chūgoku region of the island of Honshu. The Hiroshima Domain was ruled for most of its existence by the daimyō of the Asano clan and encompassed Aki Province and parts of Bingo Province with a Kokudaka system value of 426,500 koku. The Hiroshima Domain was dissolved in the abolition of the han system in 1871 by the Meiji government and its territory was absorbed into Hiroshima Prefecture.

History
In 1589, Hiroshima Castle was commissioned by Mōri Terumoto, head of the powerful Mōri clan and a member of Toyotomi Hideyoshi's Council of Five Elders. In 1591, Terumoto relocated to Hiroshima while it was still under construction, using it as his base to rule his domain covering most of the Chūgoku region. Following the Battle of Sekigahara in 1600, the Mōri were forced out of Hiroshima by Tokugawa Ieyasu and relocated their base to Hagi Castle, losing most of their eastern territories. The Hiroshima han (domain) was subsequently established with Fukushima Masanori as its daimyō (feudal lord), covering Aki Province and parts of neighboring Bingo Province. However, nineteen years later, Hiroshima Castle suffered extensive flood damage and Fukushima repaired it in violation of the Tokugawa shogunate's laws on the construction and repair of castles (see buke shohatto). The shogunate then ordered Fukushima to Kawanakajima Domain, and awarded Hiroshima to the Asano clan, who ruled it for the remainder of the Edo period. Under the Tokugawa Kokudaka system for domains the Hiroshima Domain was assessed at 426,500 koku, the sixth-largest domain in Japan, excepting those held by the Tokugawa-Matsudaira dynasty.

In 1871, the Hiroshima Domain was formally dismantled along with all the other domains in Japan following the Meiji Restoration. The introduction of the Fuhanken sanchisei saw the replacement of the provinces and domains with the prefecture system, and territory of the Hiroshima Domain was organized into Hiroshima Prefecture.

Daimyō of Hiroshima
Mōri Terumoto (1591–1600)*; 1,120,000 koku
Fukushima Masanori (1600–1619); 498,223 koku
Asano clan:
Asano Nagaakira (1619–1632); 426,500 koku**
Asano Mitsuakira (1632–1672)
Asano Tsunaakira (1672–1673)
Asano Tsunanaga (1673–1708)
Asano Yoshinaga (1708–1752)
Asano Munetsune (1752–1763)
Asano Shigeakira (1763–1799)
Asano Narikata (1799–1830)
Asano Naritaka (1831–1858)
Asano Yoshiteru (1858–1858)
Asano Nagamichi (1858–1869)
Asano Nagakoto (1869–1871)

*The years listed are those in which the lord occupied Hiroshima castle, not the years of his life.
**All of the lords after Asano Nagaakira enjoyed the same 426,500 koku.

Simplified family tree of the Asano lords of Hiroshima

 I. Nagaakira, 1st Lord of Hiroshima (cr. 1619) (1586–1632; Lord: 1619–1632)
 II. Mitsuakira, 2nd Lord of Hiroshima (1617–1693; r. 1632–1672)
 III. Tsunaakira, 3rd Lord of Hiroshima (1637–1673; r. 1672–1673)
 IV. Tsunanaga, 4th Lord of Hiroshima (1659–1708; r. 1673–1708)
 V. Yoshinaga, 5th Lord of Hiroshima (1681–1752; r. 1708–1752)
 VI. Munetsune, 6th Lord of Hiroshima (1717–1788; r. 1752–1763)
  VII. Shigeakira, 7th Lord of Hiroshima (1743–1814; r. 1763–1799)
 VIII. Narikata, 8th Lord of Hiroshima (1773–1831; r. 1799–1830)
 IX. Naritaka, 9th Lord of Hiroshima (1817–1868; r. 1831–1858)
  X. Yoshiteru, 10th Lord of Hiroshima (1836–1858; r. 1858)
Nagatoshi
 XI. Nagamichi, 5th Lord of Hiroshima-Shinden, 11th Lord of Hiroshima, 26th family head (1812–1872; Lord of Hiroshima-Shinden: 1824–1858; Lord of Hiroshima: 1858–1869; 26th family head: 1869–1872)
Toshitsugu
Nagayuki, 28th family head, 2nd Marquess (1864–1947; 28th family head and 2nd Marquess: 1937–1940)
Nagatake, 29th family head, 3rd Marquess (1895–1969; 29th family head: 1940–1969; 3rd Marquess: 1940–1947)
Nagayoshi, 30th family head (1927–2007; 30th family head: 1969–2007)
Nagataka, 31st family head (b. 1956; 31st family head: 2007–present)
Toshiteru
  XII. Nagakoto, 6th Lord of Hiroshima-Shinden, 12th Lord of Hiroshima, 27th family head, 1st Marquess (1842–1937; Lord of Hiroshima-Shinden: 1858–1869; Lord of Hiroshima: 1869; Governor of Hiroshima: 1869–1871; 27th family head: 1872–1937; Marquess: cr. 1884)

References

Hiroshima Castle tourist brochure obtained at the castle.

Domains of Japan
History of Hiroshima Prefecture